Andonov is a surname. Notable people with the surname include:

Alyosha Andonov (born 1961), Bulgarian football head coach
Atanas Andonov (born 1955), Bulgarian retired male decathlete
Bobby Andonov (born 1994), known as BOBI, Australian singer, songwriter and record producer
Dalibor Andonov Gru (born 1973), Serbian musician 
Darin Andonov (born 1986), Bulgarian football player
Dimitar Andonov, Bulgarian officer and revolutionary, a leader of IMARO revolutionary band
Dimitar Andonov (footballer) (born 1987), Bulgarian footballer
Georgi Andonov (born 1983), Bulgarian footballer
Hristo Andonov (1887–1928), Bulgarian revolutionary, a leader of IMARO and IMRO revolutionary bands
Ivan Andonov (1934–2011), Bulgarian film director and actor
Ivaylo Andonov (born 1967), retired Bulgarian footballer
Kiril Andonov (born 1967), retired Bulgarian football player
Metodi Andonov (1932–1974), Bulgarian film director
Metodija Andonov-Čento (1902–1957), Macedonian statesman and first president after the Second World War
Stanimir Andonov (born 1989), Bulgarian football player

See also
Andon (disambiguation)
Andonova
Andronov
Andronovka

Bulgarian-language surnames
Macedonian-language surnames
Patronymic surnames